Abd al Kuri is a rocky island in the Guardafui Channel. As a part of the Socotra Archipelago of the Socotra Governorate of Yemen, it lies about 65 miles (105 km) southwest of the island of Socotra. It consists of granite and diorite covered by limestone.

Geography
Much of Abd al Kuri is semi-desert with little vegetation. Two ranges of hills separated near the centre occupy the entire length of the island. The northern coast consists mostly of a sandy beach with a few rocky points, while the southern coast consists of steep cliffs. Most of its inhabitants subsist on fishing. Kilmia is the main village.

Flora and fauna
Abd al Kuri has a number of endemic plant species and an endemic bird, the Abd al-Kuri sparrow with estimated population of fewer than 1,000. The island has been recognised as an Important Bird Area (IBA) by BirdLife International for the presence of the endemic sparrow as well as for colonies of red-billed tropicbirds and Persian shearwaters.

Two species of lizards which are native to Abd al Kuri, Mesalina kuri and Pristurus abdelkuri, are named for the island.

History
Thomas Fellowes was sent on HMS Briton in 1872 to Abd al Kuri, alongside Socotra, by British authorities to see if it would be a suitable place to settle liberated slaves. Fellowes decided against it, citing the poor living conditions on both islands.

In 2020, during the Yemeni Civil War, the United Arab Emirates sent what it characterized as "developmental aid" to Abd al Kuri, providing the population with teachers and textbooks.

As part of a broader effort to assert sovereignty over the entire Socotra archipelago, the United Arab Emirates has attempted to rename the island to "Kilmia."

Gallery

Map

References

Bibliography

External links

Islands of Yemen
Socotra archipelago
Islands of Somalia
Disputed islands
Territorial disputes of Yemen
Territorial disputes of Somalia
Important Bird Areas of Socotra
Seabird colonies